Stanley Maxwell "Max" Pontifex was an Australian rules footballer who played with West Torrens in the South Australian National Football League (SANFL).

Pontifex's career with West Torrens began in 1929 and ended when he was transferred by his employer to Tasmania. In Tasmania he captain / coached the City Football Club in Launceston. A centreman, he had won a Magarey Medal in 1932 and was twice West Torrens' best and fairest winner. He also represented South Australian in 10 interstate matches during his career.

He is buried at St Jude's Cemetery, Brighton along with his wife Verna Margaret nee Smith (1914–2001).

References

External links

West Torrens Football Club players
West Torrens Football Club coaches
Magarey Medal winners
City-South Football Club players
City-South Football Club coaches
Australian rules footballers from South Australia
1910 births
1998 deaths